The Houstonian can refer to:
The Houstonian Hotel
The Houstonian (newspaper), the newspaper of Sam Houston State University